CFCC may refer to:

Education
Cape Fear Community College, in Wilmington, North Carolina, United States
College of Central Florida (formerly Central Florida Community College), in Ocala, Florida, United States